Ploča ( or Plloçë) is a peak on the mountain of Mount Korab found between Albania and North Macedonia.

References

Mountains of Albania